St. Clement's Church, St. Clement Church or variants may refer to:

Australia 
 St Clement's Anglican Church, Mosman, New South Wales

Barbados 
 Saint Clement's Church, Barbados

Belgium 
 Church of St Clement, Watermael-Boitsfort, Brussels

Canada 
 St. Clement Parish (Ottawa), Ontario,North Vancouver

Czech Republic 
 St. Clement's Cathedral, Prague

Denmark 
 St. Clement's Church, Bornholm
 St. Clement's Church, Rømø

Germany 
 St. Clement's Basilica, Hanover

Italy 
 San Clemente al Laterano, Rome
 San Clemente, Brescia

Jersey 
 Parish Church of St Clement

Malta 
 St Clement's Chapel, Żejtun

North Macedonia 
 Church of St. Clement of Ohrid, Skopje

Norway 
 St. Clement's Church, Oslo, now ruined

Russia 
 St Clement's Church, Moscow

United Kingdom 
England
 St Clement's Church, Bournemouth
St Clement's Church, Cambridge
 St Clement's Church, Horsley, Derbyshire
 St Clement's Church, West Thurrock, Essex
 St Clement's Church, Chorlton-cum-Hardy, Greater Manchester
 St Clement's Church, Ordsall, Greater Manchester
 St Clement's Church, Knowlton, Kent
 St Clement's Church, Old Romney, Kent
 St Clement's, Eastcheap, City of London
 St Clement's Church, Ilford, London, now demolished
 St Clement's Church, King Square, Finsbury, London
 St Clement's Church, Notting Dale, Kensington, London
 St Clement Danes, Westminster, London
 Church of St Clement, Liverpool, Merseyside
 St Clement's Church, Norwich, Norfolk
 St Clement's Church, Oxford
 St Clement's Church, Ipswich, Suffolk
 St Clement's Church, Nechells, Birmingham, West Midlands, now demolished

 Scotland
 St Clement's Church, Rodel, Harris

United States 
 St. Clement's Chapel, Tallahassee, Florida
 Saint Clement Catholic Church, Chicago, Illinois
 St. Clements Roman Catholic Church (Saratoga Springs, New York)
 Church of St. Clement Mary Hofbauer, New York City
 Saint Clement's Church (Philadelphia), Pennsylvania
 Anglican Church of St. Clement, El Paso, Texas

See also 
 Church of Saints Clement and Panteleimon, Ohrid, North Macedonia
 St Clements (disambiguation)